The southern alligator lizard (Elgaria multicarinata) is a common species of lizard in the family Anguidae. The species is native to the Pacific coast of North America. It ranges from Baja California to the state of Washington and lives in a variety of habitats including grasslands, chaparral, forests, and even urban areas. In dry climates, it is likely to be found in moist areas or near streams.  There are five recognized subspecies.

Subspecies
The following five subspecies are recognized as being valid, including the nominotypical subspecies.
Elgaria multicarinata ignava 
Elgaria multicarinata multicarinata 
Elgaria multicarinata nana 
Elgaria multicarinata scincicauda 
Elgaria multicarinata webbii

Taxonomy and etymology
The generic name Elgaria is possibly named for an "Elgar" or a pun on "alligator." The specific name multicarinata refers to the keeled scales characteristic of this species. The common name "alligator lizard" is a reference to the fact that the back and belly scales of these lizards are reinforced by bone, as they are in alligators.

The subspecific name webbii is in honor of Thomas Hopkins Webb (1801–1866) who was Secretary of the United States and Mexican Boundary Survey (1848–1855). The subspecific name scincicauda means "skink tail".

Description

Including tail, it can reach a foot in length (30 cm). It has a round thick body with small legs and a long somewhat prehensile tail that can be twice as long as the lizard's body. Like many lizards, this species can drop its tail if attacked, possibly giving it a chance to flee. It lives on average 10 to 15 years, and survives well in captivity.

The color of this species is variable, and can be brown, gray, green, or yellowish above, often with red blotches on the middle of the back. Usually there are between 9 and 13 dark crossbands on the back, sides, and tail, with adjacent white spots. These crossbands can be pronounced or covered with reddish or yellowish color.

The scales of E. multicarinata are keeled on the back, sides, and legs. There are 14 rows of scales across the back at the middle of the body. A band of smaller granular scales separates the larger scales on the back and stomach, creating a fold along each side of the animal. These folds allow the body to expand to hold food or eggs.

Geographic range and habitat
The southern alligator lizard is native to the Pacific coast of North America, ranging from the state of Washington to Baja California. These lizards can be found across many diverse habitats, including grassland, open forest, chaparral, suburban and urban areas, and even into the desert along the Mojave River. This species is particularly common in foothill oak woodlands, and is often found hiding under rocks, logs, or other surface cover.

Diet
E. multicarinata eats small arthropods, slugs, lizards, small mammals, and occasionally young birds and eggs.

The southern alligator lizard frequently eat western black widow spiders, and has demonstrated an immunity to the spider's potent venom.

Behavior and reproduction

The southern alligator lizard frequently can be found near human habitation, and is often seen foraging in the mornings and evenings. It is often found in or around suburban yards and garages. E. multicarinata is notable for its vicious self-defense, and will bite and defecate if handled.

Mating occurs in spring, typically from April to May, though in warmer regions this species will breed year-round. Eggs are usually laid between May and June and hatch during late summer and early fall. Females lay two clutches of eggs per year, often in decaying wood or plant matter to keep them warm. Females will guard the eggs until they hatch.

See also
 Northern alligator lizard

References

External links

Western Ecological Research Center: "Elgaria multicarinatus ", the southern alligator lizard

Further reading
Behler, John L.; King, F. Wayne (1979). The Audubon Society Field Guide to North American Reptiles and Amphibians. New York: Alfred A. Knopf. 743 pp. . (Gerrhonotus multicarinatus, pp. 542 + Plates 445, 449).
Blainville, H.D. de (1835). "Description de quelques espèces de reptiles de la Californie précédée de l'analyse d'un système général d'herpétologie et amphibiologie ". Nouvelles Annales du Muséum D'Histoire Naturelle 4: 233-296. ("Cordylus (Gerrhonotus) multi-carinatus ", new species, p. 289 + Plate XXV, figures 2, 2A, 2B, 2C). (in French).
Smith, Hobart M.; Brodie, Edmund D., Jr. (1982). Reptiles of North America: A Guide to Field Identification. New York: Golden Press. 240 pp.  (paperback), 0-307-47009-1 (hardcover). (Elgaria multicarinata, pp. 88–89).

Elgaria
Reptiles of Mexico
Reptiles of the United States
Reptiles described in 1835
Taxa named by Henri Marie Ducrotay de Blainville